Ashkharatsuyts or Ašxarhac′oyc′ (Աշխարհացոյց (traditional); Աշխարհացույց (reformed)), often translated as Geography in English sources, is an early Medieval Armenian illustrated book by Anania Shirakatsi. It is about the geography of Armenia, Georgia, Iran, Iraq, etc.
Ashkharatsuyts is the oldest book in Matenadaran on geography.

See also 
 Geography of Armenia

External links 
 The Geography, to which is added a selection of Vardan's fables called Aluesagirk., 1668, Amsterdam

References 

Armenian books
Matenadaran